Pallepahad is a small village in Amthmakur (M) Mandal of Yadadri district in Telangana, India.

References

Villages in Yadadri Bhuvanagiri district